Mikhail Yuryevich Sukhoruchenko (born 13 April 2003) is a Russian football player. He plays for FC Krasnodar and FC Krasnodar-2.

Club career
He made his debut in the Russian Football National League for FC Krasnodar-2 on 8 March 2022 in a game against FC Baltika Kaliningrad.

He made his Russian Premier League debut on 8 May 2022 against FC Arsenal Tula.

Career statistics

References

External links
 
 
 

2003 births
Footballers from Moscow
Living people
Russian people of Ukrainian descent
Russian footballers
Russia youth international footballers
Association football defenders
FC Krasnodar-2 players
FC Krasnodar players
Russian First League players
Russian Premier League players